Emiko Kanda is a former international table tennis player from Japan.

Table tennis career
She won a silver medal for Japan at the 1983 World Table Tennis Championships in the Corbillon Cup (women's team event) with Mika Hoshino, Fumiko Shinpo and Tomoko Tamura.

See also
 List of World Table Tennis Championships medalists

References

Japanese female table tennis players
World Table Tennis Championships medalists